The 2010 Vojko Herksel Cup was the 5th Vojko Herksel Cup. Hold of Final tournament is Gospić. Winner of the five edition of the Šibenik Jolly who won Gospić Croatia Osiguranje.

Final tournament

References

Vojko Herksel Cup
2010–11 in European women's basketball
2010–11 in Croatian basketball
2010–11 in Serbian basketball
2010–11 in Slovenian basketball